The American post-hardcore band Dance Gavin Dance has released ten studio albums, three live albums, one extended play, 45 singles, 26 music videos, one remastered album, and 9 instrumental albums. The band was formed in Sacramento, California in 2005 by guitarist Will Swan, drummer Matt Mingus, and bassist Eric Lodge. Unclean vocalist Jon Mess and clean vocalist Jonny Craig were recruited shortly after. They self-released their debut EP, Whatever I Say Is Royal Ocean, that year, and re-released the EP in 2006 after signing to Rise Records. Their debut studio album, Downtown Battle Mountain, was released May 15, 2007 on Rise.

Dance Gavin Dance is known for their series of line-up changes. After the release of Downtown Battle Mountain, guitarist Sean O'Sullivan left the group, and was replaced by Zachary Garren. Shortly after, Jonny Craig was removed from the band due to personal conflicts. He was replaced by Kurt Travis, who performed clean vocals on the band's self-titled second album. Mess and Lodge left the band prior to the album's release on August 19, 2008, and Swan performed unclean vocals as well as lead guitar on Happiness, released June 9, 2009. By 2010, Dance Gavin Dance decided to make one final album with their original line-up before breaking up. After the release of Downtown Battle Mountain II on March 8, 2011, the group agreed not to disband.

After Craig's second departure in 2012 and subsequent replacement with former Tides of Man vocalist Tilian Pearson, Dance Gavin Dance has maintained a stable lineup. They released their first album with Pearson, Acceptance Speech, on October 7, 2013. This was followed by the release of Instant Gratification (2015), Mothership (2016), Artificial Selection (2018), and Afterburner (2020). Beginning in May 2019, the band began releasing instrumental versions of their studio albums, working backwards from Artificial Selection.

Albums

Studio albums

Live albums

Remastered albums

Instrumental albums

Extended plays

Singles

Other appearances

Music videos

References

External links
 

Discographies of American artists
Rock music group discographies
Post-hardcore group discographies